Einar Løchen (2 November 1850 – 27 November 1908) was a Norwegian jurist and politician for the Liberal Party.

He was a member of the Council of State Division in Stockholm from February 1898 to April 1899. Then, he was appointed Minister of Justice and the Police in the second cabinet Steen. Løchen left this post in 1900, to become the ninth Chief Justice of the Supreme Court of Norway, a post he held until his death.

References

1850 births
1908 deaths
Government ministers of Norway
Liberal Party (Norway) politicians
Chief justices of Norway
Ministers of Justice of Norway